The Melbourne shuffle is a rave dance that developed in the 1980s. Typically performed to electronic music, the dance originated in the Melbourne rave scene and was popular in the late 1980s and 1990s. The dance moves involve a fast heel-and-toe movement or T-step, combined with a variation of the running man coupled with a matching arm action. The dance is improvised and involves "repeatedly shuffling your feet inwards, then outwards, while thrusting your arms up and down, or side to side, in time with the beat". Other moves can be incorporated including 360-degree spins and jumps and slides. Popular Melbourne clubs during the dance's heyday included Hard Kandy, Bubble, Xpress at Chasers, Heat, Mercury Lounge, Viper, Two Tribes at Chasers and PHD. Melbourne's first techno dance parties Biology, Hardware and Every Picture Tells A Story were popular with Melbourne Shuffle innovators.

In 2009, the German hard dance group Scooter featured dancers Pae (Missaghi Peyman) and Sarah Miatt performing the Melbourne shuffle on the streets of Melbourne (Australia) in the music video of their single J'adore Hardcore.

In 2014, researchers at Brown University named a new computer security algorithm after the Melbourne shuffle. The algorithm deletes traces of users' access on cloud servers by shuffling the location of data on those servers.

UK and Netherlands 
While the Melbourne shuffle was growing popular in Australia a different style of Shuffling was growing in the UK which would go on to be referred to as "cutting shapes" by 2012. The adopted slang term for the UK style of Shuffling "Cutting Shapes" has been popularized and categorized as a subgenre of Shuffle Dance today.  While Cutting Shapes is considered Shuffle Dancing, it is largely different in style, technique, and history from the Melbourne shuffle.

Technique

The underlying dance moves involve the T-step, combined with a variation of the running man. The dance is improvised and involves "repeatedly shuffling your feet inwards, then outwards, while thrusting your arms up and down, or side to side, in time with the beat". 360-degree spins, jumps and slides are also incorporated. It is often associated with another style of dance, "cutting shapes."

Some dancers sprinkle talcum powder or apply liquid to the floor beneath their feet to help them slide more easily.

References

Further reading

External links
 

Syllabus-free dance
Culture of Melbourne
Dances of Australia
Hardcore (electronic dance music genre)
Australian inventions
Rave